FC Ufa is a Russian football club based in Ufa that will play in the second-tier Russian First League in the 2022–23 season.

History
During the summer of 2010, Rustem Khamitov, the second President of the Republic of Bashkortostan, began considering the establishment of a football club with the intention to represent the city of Ufa and also the Republic in the Russian Premier League.

On 23 December 2010, FC Ufa was formed on the base of FC Bashinformsvyaz-Dynamo Ufa, which then plied their trade in the Russian Professional Football League, the third tier of the Russian football league system. The head coaching position of the team was first assigned to Andrei Kanchelskis, who was tasked with leading the club to the Russian First Division.

First season
The first official match of the club was against FC Syzran-2003 in the second round of the Russian Cup, which after extra time Ufa lost on penalties.

Ufa made their debut in the Russian league system on 24 April 2011 with a home match against FC Tyumen. Ufa ran out winners, 3–1, with Konstantin Ionov scoring a hat-trick for the hosts.

Ufa continued to build on their initial success to the extent that, coming to the end of the season, they were equal with Neftekhimik Nizhnekamsk at the top of the table with 86 points. However, Ufa's loss away to Nefthekhimik following the draw at Dynamo Stadium meant that Neftekhimik Nizhnekamsk had a better head-to-head record; Ufa had to postpone promotion to the Russian First Division for another year.

However, Dynamo Bryansk's failure to meet the licensing requirements for the 2012–13 Russian First Division opened up a slot in the said division, which Ufa took, enabling their promotion from the Second Division into the First Division.

Life in the First Division
In their first season in the First Division Ufa finished in sixth, four points off the last promotion playoff spot.

The following season showed improvement by Ufa, as the club had built on the previous year's showing and managed to end up in fourth, thus enabling them to contest the promotion playoff against Tom Tomsk, who finished their campaign in the Russian Premier League in 13th.

On 18 May 2014, Ufa welcomed Tom Tomsk in Dynamo for the first leg of the playoff and Ufa managed to overpower Tom 5–1, with club captain Dmitri Golubov scoring four goals. The return leg was played four days later in Tomsk, and despite going down early in the match, Ufa managed to hold on to their aggregate lead; a 3–1 loss to Tom was moot. Ufa therefore claimed a historic promotion to the top-flight Russian Premier League after just three seasons playing in the Russian league system.

Premier League period
At the end of the 2017–18 season, they secured 6th spot in the Russian Premier League, which qualified them for the 2018–19 UEFA Europa League due to FC Tosno, the Russian Cup winner, not applying for the UEFA license in time.

Ufa played their first ever European game at home against Slovenian side NK Domzale. The game finished in a goalless draw. Domzale dominated the return leg in Slovenia but Ufa didn't give up and a late goal saw them draw 1-1 and progress on away goals. Next was Progres Niederkorn for the Russian side, and another late goal in the return leg in Luxembourg send Ufa through 4-3 on aggregate and set them up against Scottish side Rangers in the play-off round. They lost 1-0 at Ibrox, and drew 1-1 at their stadium, which caused them to be eliminated from the play-off rounds of the Europa League. For the 2020-21 season, the club changed its colour scheme from red to purple and mint green.

In the 2021–22 season, Ufa avoided direct relegation by winning a dramatic away game against FC Rubin Kazan on the last matchday of the regular season, Dilan Ortiz scored a go-ahead goal in the 90th minute and Rubin's Vitaly Lisakovich missed the added-time penalty kick for Rubin, which would mean Ufa's direct relegation if scored, instead Rubin was relegated directly and Ufa qualified for the relegation play-offs. In the subsequent play-offs against FC Orenburg, Ufa was ahead 2–0 in the first leg away game before Orenburg came back and equalized 2–2. In the return leg on Ufa's home field, the score was 1–1 (which would keep Ufa's Premier League spot on away goals rule) before Orenburg's Andrei Malykh scored the winning goal in 4th added minute to ensure Ufa's relegation to FNL.

Domestic history

European history
Ufa made their UEFA competition debut in July 2018, entering the 2018–19 UEFA Europa League second qualifying round.

Current squad

Reserve team

Coaching staff

Other clubs
WFC Ufa, a female football club, plays in the Russian First Division, the second tier of the Women Russian football system.

Notable players
Had international caps for their respective countries. Players whose name is listed in bold represented their countries while playing for Ufa.

Russia
 Sergei Borodin
 Igor Diveyev
 Daniil Fomin
 Oleg Ivanov
 Danil Krugovoy
 Andrey Lunyov
 Ivan Oblyakov
 Dmitry Stotsky
 Viktor Vasin
 Anton Zabolotny

Former USSR countries
 Aleksey Skvernyuk
 Dzmitry Verkhawtsow
 Syarhey Vyeramko
 Jemal Tabidze
 Cătălin Carp
 Valery Kichin
 Oleksandr Zinchenko

 Vagiz Galiulin
 Oston Urunov
Europe
 Moritz Bauer
 Haris Handžić
 Ondřej Vaněk
 Olivier Thill
 Nemanja Miletić
 Lovro Bizjak
 Bojan Jokić
 Ionuț Nedelcearu

North America
 Felicio Brown Forbes

Africa
 Emmanuel Frimpong
 Sylvester Igboun

References

External links

Official website 

 
Football clubs in Russia
Sport in Ufa
Association football clubs established in 2009
2009 establishments in Russia